Mohammad Wasim or Muhammad Wasim may refer to:

 Mohammad Wasim (boxer) (born 1987), Pakistani boxer
 Mohammad Wasim (cricketer, born 2001), Pakistani cricketer

See also
 Mohammad Wasim Abbasi (born 1978), Pakistani cricketer and coach
 Mohammad Wasim Mandozai (born 1993), Afghan cricketer